The Dixie Flyer is a 1926 American silent action film directed by Charles J. Hunt and starring Cullen Landis, Eva Novak and Ferdinand Munier.

Cast
 Cullen Landis as 'Sunrise' Smith 
 Eva Novak as Rose Rapley / Rose Jones 
 Ferdinand Munier as President John J. Rapley 
 John Elliott as Vice-president Arthur Bedford 
 Art Rowlands as Tom Bedford 
 Pat Harmon as Chief Clerk J. K. Burke 
 Frank Davis as Mike Clancy 
 Mary Gordon as Mrs. Clancy

References

Bibliography
 James Monaco. The Encyclopedia of Film. Perigee Books, 1991.

External links

1926 films
1920s action films
American action films
Films directed by Charles J. Hunt
American silent feature films
Rayart Pictures films
American black-and-white films
1920s English-language films
1920s American films